The Georgia women's national volleyball team represents the country of Georgia in international women's volleyball competitions and friendly matches.

Results

European Championship
 Champions   Runners-up   Third place   Fourth place

European Volleyball League
 Champions   Runners-up   Third place   Fourth place

External links
FIVB profile

National women's volleyball teams
Volleyball
Women's volleyball in Georgia (country)